Aqa Bil may refer to:
 Aqa Bil-e Olya
 Aqa Bil-e Sofla